The 2000 Football League Cup Final was played between Leicester City, in their third final appearance in four years, and First Division side Tranmere Rovers at Wembley Stadium on 27 February 2000. It was the 34th and last League Cup Final to be played at the original Wembley Stadium. Leicester won 2–1 to become the last team to win the League Cup at the old Wembley.

Road to the final

Match summary
Scott Taylor's successful tackle on Robbie Savage forced the ball out for a corner, and Matt Elliott headed home Leicester's first goal courtesy of a Steve Guppy cross from the right.
Leicester came close to scoring a second goal in the 60th minute when Emile Heskey passed the ball to an unmarked Muzzy Izzet in the penalty box, who hesitated and his shot flew wide of the goal.
Referee Alan Wilkie later suffered an injury in the right leg in the 62nd minute, and was stretchered off. Phil Richards, the fourth official, was brought on to replace him.

Clint Hill picked up his second booking and was sent off after a deliberate foul on Heskey in the 63rd minute. Several Tranmere players protested but the decision stood.
Tranmere, down to ten men, rallied and their persistence paid off when they equalised in the 77th minute when a fine header found its way to an unmarked David Kelly who, after narrowly escaping Matt Elliott's attempted tackle, shot low to the left past goalkeeper Tim Flowers. Yet, just three minutes later, Elliott scored another towering header from another Guppy corner kick from the right, and the League Cup went to Leicester.

Match details

References

Cup
2000 sports events in London
Events at Wembley Stadium
2000
League Cup Final 2000
League Cup Final 2000
February 2000 sports events in the United Kingdom